The Coalition for Jewish Values is an American Orthodox Jewish advocacy organization founded in 2017.  it claims to be the largest rabbinic public policy organization in America, representing over 2000 Orthodox rabbis. Outside critics described it as a fringe group with little support in the Orthodox community, but Orthodox outlets call it an authentic "Torah voice" presenting the opinions of that community.

References

External links 
 

Advocacy groups in the United States
Jewish-American political organizations